The men's 3x3 basketball tournament at the 2015 European Games was held in Baku, Azerbaijan at the temporary Basketball Arena from 23 to 26 June.

Medalists

Team rosters

Preliminary round

Pool A

Pool B

Pool C

Pool D

Knockout round

Bracket

See also
Basketball at the 2015 European Games – Women's tournament

References

Men's